{{DISPLAYTITLE:C8H10O3}}
The molecular formula C8H10O3 (molar mass: 154.16 g/mol, exact mass: 154.0629938 u) may refer to:

 Hydroxytyrosol
 Methacrylic anhydride
 Syringol
 Vanillyl alcohol
 Terrein

Molecular formulas